Sapphire Stakes may refer to:

Sapphire Stakes (ATC), an Australian Turf Club horse race held at Randwick Racecourse in Australia
Sapphire Stakes (Ireland), a horse race held at the Curragh Racecourse in Ireland
Sapphire Stakes (United States), a horse race held at Sheepshead Bay Race Track in New York